List of Scandinavian skalds.

List

A
 Aðils konungr (Aðils)
 Alrekr konungr (Alrekr)
 Angantýr Arngrímsson (Angantýr)
 Angantýr Heiðreksson (AngH)
 Arnfinnr's daughter (jarls)
 Arngrímr ábóti Brandsson (Arngr)
 Arnórr jarlaskáld Þórðarson (Arn)
 Atli litli (Atli)
 Auðr (Auðr)
 Auðunn illskælda (Auðunn)
 Ámundi Árnason (ÁmÁrn)
 Án bogsveigir (Án)
 Ármóðr (Árm)
 Ármóðr's daughter (Ármóðsd)
 Árni ábóti Jónsson (Árni)
 Árni óreiða Magnússon (Áóreið)
 Ásbjǫrn Þorsteinsson (ÁsbÞ)
 Ásbjǫrn (Ásb)
 Ásdís Bárðardóttir (Ásd)
 Ásgrímr Jónsson (Ásgr)
 Ásgrímr Ketilsson (ÁKet)
 Ásmundr hærulangr (Ásmh)
 Ásmundr kappabana (Ásmk)
 Ásmundr (Ásm)

B
 Bárðr á Upplǫndum (Bárðr)
 Bersi Skáld-Torfuson (Bersi)
 Bjarmi jarl (Bjarmij)
 Bjarni ...ason (Bjarni)
 Bjarni byskup Kolbeinsson (Bjbp)
 Bjarni gullbrárskáld Hallbjarnarson (BjHall)
 Bjarni Kálfsson (BjKálfs)
 Bjǫrn breiðvíkingakappi Ásbrandsson (Bbreiðv)
 Bjǫrn Hítdœlakappi Arngeirsson (Bjhít)
 Bjǫrn krepphendi (Bkrepp)
 Bjǫrn Ragnarsson (BjRagn)
 Bjǫrn (Bjǫrn)
 Blakkr (Blakkr)
 Bótólfr begla (Bót)
 Bragi inn gamli Boddason (Bragi)
 Brandr inn víðfǫrli (Brandrv)
 Brandr (Brandr)
 Brennu-Njáll Þorgeirsson (Njáll)
 Brúni (Brúni)
 Brúsi Hallason (Brúsi)
 Brynjólfr úlfaldi (Brúlf)
 Busla (Busla)
 Bǫðmóðr Framarsson (Bǫðmóðr)
 Bǫðvarr balti (Balti)
 Bǫlverkr Arnórsson (Bǫlv)

D
 Dagstyggr Þórðarson (Dagst)

E
 Egill Skallagrímsson (Egill)
 Eilífr Goðrúnarson (Eil)
 Eilífr kúlnasveinn (Ekúl)
 Eilífr Snorrason (EilSn)
 Einarr draumr Þorsteinsson (Edraum)
 Einarr Gilsson (EGils)
 Einarr skálaglamm Helgason (Eskál)
 Einarr Skúlason (ESk)
 Einarr þambarskelfir Eindriðason (Eþsk)
 Einarr þveræingr Eyjólfsson (Eþver)
 Eindriði Einarsson (Eindr)
 Eiríkr Ragnarsson (EirRagn)
 Eiríkr viðsjá (Eviðs)
 Eiríkr (Eir)
 Eldjárn (Eldj)
 Erringar-Steinn (ErrSt)
 Eyjólfr Brúnason (EBrún)
 Eyjólfr dáðaskáld (Edáð)
 Eyjólfr forni (Eforn)
 Eyjólfr Valgerðarson (EValg)
 Eysteinn Ásgrímsson (Eyst) 
 Eysteinn konungr (Eystk)
 Eysteinn Valdason (EVald)
 Eyvindr skáldaspillir Finnsson (Eyv)

F
 Feima Hrímnisdóttir (Feima)
 Finngálkn (Finng)
 Fjǫlmóðr Skafnǫrtungsson (Fjǫl)
 Forað (Forað)
 Framarr víkingakonungr (Framarr)
 Friðþjófr Þorsteinsson (FriðÞ)

G
 Gamli gnævaðarskáld (Ggnæv)
 Gamli kanóki (Gamlkan)
 Gauti konungr (Gauti)
 Gestr Þorhallsson (Gestr)
 Gestumblindi (Gestumbl)
 Gillingr Skafnǫrtungsson (Gill)
 Gizurr Grýtingaliði (GizGrý)
 Gizurr svarti (gullbrárskáld) (Gizsv)
 Gizurr Þorvaldsson (Giz)
 Gísl Illugason (Gísl)
 Gísli Súrsson (GSúrs)
 Gísli Þorgautsson (GÞorg)
 Glúmr Geirason (Glúmr)
 Glúmr Þorkelsson (GÞork)
 Grani skáld (Grani)
 Grettir Ásmundarson (Grett)
 Grímkell Bjarnarson (Grímk)
 Grímr Droplaugarson (GDrop)
 Grímr Hjaltason (GrHj)
 Grímr loðinkinni (Gríml)
 Gríss Sæmingsson (Gríss)
 Guðbrandr í Svǫlum (Guðbr)
 Guðlaugr (Guðl)
 Guðmundr Ásbjarnarson (GÁsb)
 Guðmundr Galtason (GGalt)
 Guðmundr Oddson (GOdds)
 Guðmundr Svertingsson (GSvert)
 Gullásu-Þórðr (GullásÞ)
 Gunnarr Hámundarson (GunnHám)
 Gunnarr Lambason (Gunnarr)
 Gunnhildr konungamóðir (Gunnh)
 Gunnlaugr Leifsson (GunnLeif)
 Gunnlaugr ormstunga Illugason (GunnlI)
 Gusi finnakonungr (Gusi)
 Guthormr kǫrtr Helgason (Gkǫrt)
 Guthormr sindri (Gsind)
 Gyðja (Gyðja)
 Gyrðr byskup and Eysteinn Ásgrímsson (GyrEyst)

H
 Hafliði (Hafl)
 Hallar-Steinn (HSt)
 Hallbjǫrn hali (Hhal)
 Hallbjǫrn Oddsson (Hallbj)
 Halldórr ókristni (Hókr)
 Halldórr Rannveigarson (HalldR)
 Halldórr skvaldri (Hskv)
 Hallfreðr vandræðaskáld Óttarsson (Hfr)
 Hallgrímr (Hallg)
 Halli berserkr (Halli)
 Halli stirði (Halli XI)
 Hallmundr bergbúinn (Hallm)
 Hallmundr (HallmGr)
 Hallr Snorrason (HSn)
 Hallr Þórarinsson breiðmaga (Hbreiðm)
 Hallstein Þengilsson (Hallst)
 Hallvarðr háreksblesi (Hallv)
 Hallvarðr (Hallvarðr)
 Haraldr harðráði Sigurðarson (Hharð)
 Haraldr hárfagri Hálfdanarson (Hhárf)
 Haukr Valdísarson (HaukrV)
 Hákon inn góði Haraldsson (Hákg)
 Hálfr Hjǫrleifsson (Hálfr)
 Hárekr í Þjóttu (Hár)
 Hásteinn Hrómundarson (Hást)
 Hástigi (Hástigi)
 Hávarðr halti ísfirðingr (Hávh)
 Heiðr vǫlva (Heiðv)
 Heiðr (Heiðr)
 Heiðrekr (Heiðrekr)
 Heinrekr (Heinr)
 Helga Bárðardóttir (HelgaB)
 Helgi Ásbjarnarson (HÁsbj)
 Helgi dýr Skefilsson (Hdýr)
 Helgi trausti Óláfsson (HelgÓl)
 Hergunnr (Hergunnr)
 Hervǫr Hundingjadóttir (HervH)
 Hervǫr (Herv)
 Hetta (Hetta)
 Hildibrandr (Hildibrandr)
 Hildigunnr (Hildigunnr)
 Hildr Hrólfsdóttir nefju (Hildr)
 Hjalti Skeggjason (Hjalti)
 Hjálmarr inn hugumstóri (Hjálm)
 Hjálmþér Ingason (Hjþ)
 Hjǫrleifr konungr (Hjǫrleifr)
 Hjǫrtr (Hjǫrtr)
 Hlǫðr Heiðreksson (HlǫðH)
 Hofgarða-Refr Gestsson (Refr)
 Hólmgǫngu-Bersi Véleifsson (HólmgB)
 Hólmgǫngu-Skeggi (HólmgSk)
 Hrafn Ǫnundarson (HrafnǪ)
 Hreggviðr konungr (Hregg)
 Hringr konungr (Hringrk)
 Hrókr inn svarti (Hróksv)
 Hrómundr halti Eyvindarson (Hróm)
 Humli konungr (Humli)
 Hundingi konungr (Hundk)
 Hvítserkr Ragnarsson (HvítRagn)
 Hǫrðr Grímkelsson (HǫrðG)
 Hǫrðr/Hringr (Hǫrðr)

I
 Illugi bryndœlaskáld (Ill)
 Ingimarr af Aski Sveinsson (Ingimarr)
 Ingimundr Einarsson (IngimE)
 Ingjaldr Geirmundarson (Ingj)
 Innsteinn Gunnlaðarson (Innsteinn)
 Ímsigull Skafnǫrtungsson (Íms)
 Ívarr Ingimundarson (Ív)
 Ívarr Ragnarsson (ÍvRagn)
 Játgeirr Torfason (Játg)
 Jón Þorvaldsson (Jón)
 Jórunn skáldmær (Jór)
 Jǫkull Bárðarson (Jǫk)

K
 Kali Sæbjarnarson (Kali)
 Karl inn rauði (Karl)
 Kálfr Hallsson (Kálf)
 Kári Sǫlmundarson (Kári)
 Ketill hœngr (Keth)
 Ketilríðr Hólmkelsdóttir (Ketilr)
 Klaufi Snækollsson (Klauf)
 Kleima Hrímnisdóttir (Kleima)
 Klœingr Þorsteinsson (Klœ)
 Kolbeinn Tumason (Kolb)
 Kolgrímr litli (Kolgr)
 Kolli inn prúði (Kolli)
 Kormákr Ǫgmundarson (KormǪ)
 Kráka/Áslaug Sigurðardóttir (KrákÁsl)
 Króka-Refr (KrRef)
 Kveldúlfr Bjálfason (Kveld)

L
 Leiðólfr skáld (Leiðólfr)
 Leiknir berserkr (Leiknir)
 Loptr Pálsson (Loptr)

M
 Magnús berfœttr Óláfsson (Mberf)
 Magnús inn góði Óláfsson (Mgóð)
 Magnús Þórðarson (MÞórð)
 Margerðr (Margerðr)
 Markús Skeggjason (Mark)
 Marmennill (Marm)
 Mágus jarl (Mágj)
 Máni (Máni)
 Móðólfr Ketilsson (Móð)

N
 Narfi (Narfi)
 Nefari (Nefari)
 Neri (Neri)
 Níkulás Bergsson (Ník)

O
 Oddi inn litli Glúmsson (Oddi)
 Oddr breiðfirðingr (Obreið)
 Oddr kíkinaskáld (Okík)
 Oddr Snorrason (OSnorr)
 Ormarr (Ormarr)
 Ormr Barreyjarskáld (OBarr)
 Ormr Steinþórsson (Ormr)
 Ormr svínfellingr Jónsson (Ormrs)
 Ófeigr Skíðason (Ófeigr)
 Óláfr bjarnylr Hávarðarson (Ólbjarn)
 Óláfr Brynjólfsson (ÓlBrynj)
 Óláfr hvítaskáld Þórðarson (Ólhv)
 Óláfr inn helgi Haraldsson (Ólhelg)
 Óláfr svartaskáld Leggsson (Ólsv)
 Óláfr Tryggvason (ÓTr)
 Ólǫf geisli Þórisdóttir (Ólǫf)
 Óspakr Glúmsson (Óspakr)
 Óttarr svarti (Ótt)

P
 Páll Þorsteinsson (Páll)
 Ragnarr loðbrók (Rloð)
 Reginn (Reginn)
 Rúnólfr Ketilsson (RKet)
 Rǫgnvaldr jarl and Hallr Þórarinsson (RvHbreiðm)
 Rǫgnvaldr jarl Kali Kolsson (Rv)

S
 Sigmundr Lambason (Sigmund)
 Sigmundr ǫngull (Sigm)
 Signý Hálfdanardóttir (SigHálf)
 Signý Valbrandsdóttir (SignV)
 Sigurðr jórsalafari Magnússon (Sjórs)
 Sigurðr ormr í auga (Sigoa)
 Sigurðr slembidjákn Magnússon (Slembir)
 Sigurðr (Sigurðr)
 Sigvatr Sturluson (SigvSt)
 Sigvatr Þórðarson (Sigv)
 Sjólfr (Sjólfr)
 Skallagrímr Kveldúlfsson (Skall)
 Skapti Þóroddsson (Skapti)
 Skarpheðinn Njálsson (Skarp)
 Skáldhallr (Skáldh)
 Skáldhelgi Þórðarson (ShÞ)
 Skáldþórir (Skáldþ)
 Skinnhúfa/Hildisif (Skinnhúfa)
 Skraut-Oddr (SkrautO)
 Skúli Þorsteinsson (Skúli)
 Sneglu-Halli (SnH)
 Snjólfr (Snjólfr)
 Snorri goði Þorgrímsson (Snorri)
 Snorri Sturluson (SnSt)
 Snæbjǫrn (Snæbj)
 Snækollr Gunnason (Snæk)
 Sóti (Sóti)
 Starkaðr gamli Stórvirksson (StarkSt)
 Stefnir Þorgilsson (Stefnir)
 Steigar-Þórir Þórðarson (SteigÞ)
 Steinarr Sjónason (StSj)
 Steinarr (Steinarr)
 Steingerðr Þorkelsdóttir (Steing)
 Steinn Herdísarson (Steinn)
 Steinunn Refs (Dálks)dóttir (Steinunn)
 Steinþórr (Steinþ)
 Stjǫrnu-Oddi Helgason (StjOdd)
 Sturla Bárðarson (SturlB)
 Sturla Sigvatsson (SturlaS)
 Sturla Þórðarson (Sturl)
 Sturlaugr inn starfsami Ingólfsson (Sturlst)
 Stúfr inn blindi Þórðarson kattar (Stúfr)
 Styrbjǫrn (Styrb)
 Styrkárr Oddason (Styrkárr)
 Svanr á Svanshóli (Svanr)
 Svartr á Hofstöðum (Svart)
 Sveinn á Bakka (SvB)
 Sveinn tjúguskegg Haraldsson (Svtjúg)
 Sveinn (Sveinn)
 Svertingr Þorleifsson (Svert)

T
 Tannr Bjarnason (Tannr)
 Tindr Hallkelsson (Tindr)
 Tjǫrvi inn háðsami (Tjǫrvi)
 Torf-Einarr Rǫgnvaldsson (TorfE)
 Torfi Valbrandsson (TorfiV)
 Tóki víkingr (Tóki)
 Trausti Þorgrímsson (Traust)

U
 Unnr Marðardóttir (Unnr)
 Úlfr inn rauði (Úlfrauð)
 Úlfr stallari Óspaksson (Úlfr)
 Úlfr Uggason (ÚlfrU)
 Útsteinn Gunnlaðarson (Útsteinn)

V
 Vagn Ákason (Vagn)
 Valgarðr á Velli (Valg)
 Vargeisa/Álfsól (Vargeisa)
 Vetrliði Sumarliðason (Vetrl)
 Vémundr Hrólfsson (Vém)
 Vitgeirr seiðmaðr (Vitg)
 Víga-Glúmr Eyjólfsson (VGl)
 Víga-Styrr Þorgrímsson (Styr)
 Vígbjóðr and Vestmarr (VígVest)
 Vígfúss Víga-Glúmsson (Vígf)
 Víglundr Þorgrímsson (VíglÞ)
 Vǫlu-Steinn (VSt)

Y
 Ýma trǫllkona (Ýma)

Þ
 Þjalar-Jón Svipdagsson (ÞjJ)
 Þjóðólfr Arnórsson (ÞjóðA)
 Þjóðólfr ór Hvini (Þjóð)
 Þjóðólfr (Þjóðólfr)
 Þorbjǫrg (Þorb)
 Þorbjǫrn Brúnason (ÞBrún)
 Þorbjǫrn dísarskáld (Þdís)
 Þorbjǫrn hornklofi (Þhorn)
 Þorbjǫrn skakkaskáld (Þskakk)
 Þorbjǫrn svarti (Þsvart)
 Þorbjǫrn þyna (Þþyn)
 Þorbjǫrn ǫngull (Þbj)
 Þorfinnr munnr (Þorf)
 Þorgeirr flekkr (Þflekk)
 Þorgils fiskimaðr (Þfisk)
 Þorgils Hǫlluson (ÞórgHǫll)
 Þorgils Oddason (ÞorgO)
 Þorgrímr goði Þorsteinsson (Þorggoð)
 Þórhallr veiðimaðr (Þorhv)
 Þórhildr skáldkona (Þorh)
 Þorkell elfaraskáld (Þelf)
 Þorkell Gíslason (ÞGísl)
 Þorkell hamarskáld (Þham)
 Þorkell í Hraundal (ÞorkHraun)
 Þorkell klyppr Þórðarson (Þklypp)
 Þorkell Skallason (ÞSkall)
 Þorkell Súrsson (ÞSúrs)
 Þorleifr jarlsskáld Rauðfeldarson (Þjsk)
 Þorleifr skúma Þorkelsson (Þskúm)
 Þorleikr fagri (Þfagr)
 Þormóðr Kolbrúnarskáld (Þorm)
 Þormóðr Óláfsson (ÞormÓl)
 Þormóðr Trefilsson (ÞTref)
 Þorsteinn draummaðrinn (Þorstk)
 Þorsteinn drómundr (Þstdr)
 Þorsteinn tjaldstœðingr Ásgrímsson (Þtjald)
 Þorsteinn Þorvarðsson (ÞorstÞ)
 Þorvaldr blǫnduskáld (Þblǫnd)
 Þorvaldr Hjaltason (ÞHjalt)
 Þorvaldr inn víðfǫrli Koðránsson (Þvíðf)
 Þorvaldr veili (Þveil)
 Þorvarðr tréfótr (Þtréf)
 Þorvarðr Þorgeirsson (Þorv)
 Þórarinn loftunga, author of Hofuðlausn and Tøgdrápa.
 Þórarinn Skeggjason (ÞSkegg)
 Þórarinn stuttfeldr (Þstf)
 Þórarinn svarti máhlíðingr Þórólfsson (Þmáhl)
 Þórarinn (Þór)
 Þórálfr (-valdr) (Þórálfr)
 Þórðr bóndi (ÞórðVígl)
 Þórðr hreða (Þórðh)
 Þórðr Kolbeinsson (ÞKolb)
 Þórðr mauraskáld (Þmaur)
 Þórðr rúfeyjaskáld (Þrúf)
 Þórðr Særeksson (Sjáreksson) (ÞSjár)
 Þórðr vazfirðingr (Þvazf)
 Þórir at Ǫxnakeldu (ÞórǪx)
 Þórir hundsfótr (Þórhunds)
 Þórir jǫkull (Þjǫk)
 Þórir snepill Ketilsson (Þórsnep)
 Þráinn Sigfússon (ÞráS)
 Þrándr í Gǫtu (Þrándr)
 Þuríðr Óláfsdóttir pá (Þuríðr)

Ǫ
 Ǫgmundr Eyþjófsbani (ǪgmEyb)
 Ǫgmundr sneis Þorvarðsson (Ǫgm)
 Ǫgvaldr konungr
 Ǫlvir Herrauðsson (ǪlvH)
 Ǫlvir hnúfa (Ǫlv)
 Ǫlvǫr (Ǫlvǫr)
 Ǫnundr Ófeigsson (ǪnÓf)
 Ǫrvar-Oddr (ǪrvOdd)

Anonymous skaldic poetry
 Anonymous Lausavísur (Anon) - Unknown skald or skalds from a number of texts, mentioned as Lausavísur or Lausavísa.
 Anonymous Poems (Anon) - A collection of anonymous poems, authors unknown.
 Anonymous Rune Poems (Anon) - An Icelandic Rune Poem and a Norwegian Rune Poem, authors unknown.
 Anonymous Þulur (Þul) - A collection of 66 texts from the 12th century, author unknown.
 Middle Ages (Run)
 Mythological sources (Myth)
 Older Futhark (Run)
 Viking Age (Run)

See also 

 List of Icelandic writers
 Icelandic literature

References 

 All entries sourced from:

Lists of poets
Icelandic writers
Norwegian writers
 List of skalds
Skaldic poetry